Disk cartridge or Optical disk cartridge may refer to:

 A 1960s computer disk pack which has a single hard disk platter encased in a protective plastic shell
 Removable disk storage media 
 Zip disk 
 A 3-inch Floppy disk
 An optical disc or magneto-optical disc enclosed in a protective plastic sheath called a Caddy (hardware)
 Ultra Density Optical
 Universal Media Disc
 Disk enclosure
 ROM cartridge